Ågotnes is a village in Øygarden municipality in Vestland county, Norway. It is the site of a primary school, sports facilities, fire station, and health clinic. It is also a main supply base for the oil industry.

References

Villages in Vestland
Øygarden